The Bedford Bypass, internally designated as Trunk 33, is a highway in the Canadian province of Nova Scotia.

The highway is not visibly assigned with a route number; however, it is assigned Trunk 33 by the provincial transportation department as an unsigned highway.  Many maps incorrectly show it as an eastern continuation of Highway 101.

The road was built in 1977 to connect the eastern end of Highway 101 and to accommodate nearby truck (mainly B-Train) traffic from the nearby Burnside Industrial Park, relieving traffic from the center of the former town of Bedford and the steep hill entering the town. The posted speed limit is 90 km/h (55 mph).

Exit list

References

Nova Scotia provincial highways
Roads in Halifax, Nova Scotia
Limited-access roads in Canada